Mystic Power is a 2013 reggae album by the Ivorian artist Alpha Blondy.

Songs on the album address the Second Ivorian Civil War.

Critical reception
The Washington Post wrote that "the songs are upbeat and assured, whether fueled by the soulful horns and backing vocals of 'My American Dream' or the slinky groove of 'J’ai Tue Le Commissaire.'” The East Bay Express wrote that "Blondy (seemingly effortlessly) does what he's done his entire career: make uplifting, inspirational music that seems to channel a higher power."

Track listing

Personnel
Alpha Blondy – lead vocals

References

2013 albums
Alpha Blondy albums